North Weston is a village in the North Somerset district of Somerset, England. It lies between Portishead and Weston-in-Gordano, within the town council area of Portishead. In the 2001 census the North Weston ward (which includes the Redcliffe Bay area of Portishead) had a population of 3,890.

At the north end of the village is Gordano School. To the west of the village lies Weston Big Wood.

North Weston was historically a hamlet in the parish of Portishead. It was created a separate civil parish in 1894. In 1993 the parish was united with Portishead.

References 

Villages in North Somerset
Former civil parishes in Somerset